M. S. Arun Kumar  is an Indian politician from Kerala, who currently serves as the MLA of Mavelikkara Constituency since May 2021.

Personal life
M. S. Arunkumar studied at Pope Pius HSS, Kattanam and has an under graduate degree in Bachelor of Arts English degree from Bishop Moore College, Mavelikkara. He is currently pursuing Bachelor of Laws  at the Kerala University. M. S. Arunkumar is married to Sneha Suresh and has a daughter, Alaida.

Political career
M. S. Arunkumar contested the 2021 Kerala Legislative Assembly election from Mavelikkara assembly constituency and defeated K.K. Shaju of United Democratic Front (Kerala) by 24,717 votes.

References 

Kerala MLAs 2021–2026
Communist Party of India (Marxist) politicians from Kerala
Year of birth missing (living people)
Living people